M Street Bridge may refer to:

M Street Bridge (Sacramento, California), also known as Tower Bridge
M Street Bridge (Washington, D.C.)

See also
M Street (disambiguation)